Like, la leyenda, or simply Like is a Mexican telenovela that premiered on Las Estrellas on 10 September 2018 and ended on 20 January 2019. The telenovela is produced by Pedro Damián for Televisa. The series follows the lives of thirteen students and the problems that adolescents experience during their time in high school.

Plot 
The telenovela narrates the experiences of a group of young people interned at the Life Institute of Knowledge and Evolution (LIKE), a prestigious and cosmopolitan educational institution, with a supposedly modern and open educational system, but in reality it is deeply traditional and schematic. In this institution, which presumes its level of vanguard, each beginning of the school year a new generation of high school students are formed with rigid and tedious routines, in addition to educational techniques that do not excite anyone. The educational plan of Like, completely obsolete, has made teachers and students apathetic and conformist. That apathetic atmosphere will be challenged by Gabriel Rey, "Gabo", an atypical teacher who will come to the school after many years of experience, and who was also a student at Like. Gabo will encourage students not to conform to what adults want to impose on them, provoking a true revolution in Like, which will generate confrontations between teachers, parents and students.

Cast

Main 

 Mauricio Abad as Ulises Reyes, comes from a neighborhood in Lima, Peru. He can seem aggressive and generate distrust, because he went through a very difficult situation in life by assuming the guilt for a crime he did not commit.
 Santiago Achaga as Cláudio Meyer, he is the one who gets along with everyone and does everything he can. He is very fortunate to have been born into a family of ancestry and this privilege causes him at the same time honor and guilt.
 Roberta Damián as Antonia "Tony" De Haro, she seems predestined since she was born to be a princess. However, she struggles daily to get rid of that label. She is popular and leader by nature; is a fashion lover and loves to sing.
 Macarena García as Machu Salas, has a special ability to manipulate others, she is an innate bully. Her sense of humor, black and cruel, often makes others laugh. Her presence imposes, and is the most experienced of the group in sexual matters.
 Anna Iriyama as Keiko Kobayashi, she comes from Japan by her own means, deliberately seeking to study at LIKE after an experience that threatened her life. Nobody knows her family and her past is a mystery.
 Ale Müller as Emilia Ruiz, is a teenage mother, of Mexican family but born in Texas. She does not like to be told what to do. The problems with her mother have increased by her rebellion.
 Carlos Said as León Rubio, is the son of the leader of a cartel. Despite his young age, he is completely convinced of what he wants and what he doesn't want for his life.
 Víctor Varona as Silverio Gil, is the new rich and although he has a lot of money, he hides his class complexes and his past of poverty with designer clothes.
 Violeta Alonso as Manuela "Manu" Gandia, is always unleashing things, especially problems. Her parents died after an argument they had with her
 Eduardo Barquín as Kevin
 Briggitte Bozzo as Kathy Alonso, a rich girl of influential and overbearing parents. In the past she was the target of Machu's bullying so she decides to take revenge. She has dominated the twins Regina and Renata whom she uses and gives orders for her benefit.
 Catalina Cardona as Jessica Martínez, she has a successful vloging channel with thousands of followers. She is a trendsetter.
 Bernardo Flores as Pablo Valentín Ferrer, his family is rich and powerful in the state of Jalisco. He wanted to get away from his suffocating family, because his dream is to become a professional dancer, he does not want to inherit the family business.
 Zuri Sasson as Daniel Cohen, he has a hereditary disease that involves the degeneration of his neurons with various effects. The fact of knowing that he is going to die leads him to behave badly, and do whatever he wants without caring about anything.
 Julia Maqueo as Regina Regil De La Reguera, a twin, rich and spoiled girl, from Kathy's group. She was the second to be born and has a slightly kinder character. She works as her sister's echo.
 Paty Maqueo as Renata Regil De La Reguera, twin of Regina. She is always looking for someone to bully. She was the first to be born, she is an advantageist, envious, easily manipulated by Kathy, but she enjoys her actions against others.
 Flávio Nogueira as Thiago Souza Peralta, is hyperactive and curious. He finds no evil in people and has the gift of seeing the good in each person. He is transparent and noble feelings.
 Diana Villalpando as Romina Flores "Romi", is observant and discreet. She understood the power and protection of the low profile, to go unnoticed by others, so she allows others to be the center of attention. She lives full of doubts and aspires to be a nun.
 Christian Chávez as Gabriel "Gabo" Rey
 Candela Márquez as Candela
 Óscar Schwebel as Humberto
 Gina Castellanos as Victoria
 Zoraida Gómez as Isadora
 Ceci de la Cueva as Sole
 Luz Aldán as Graciela "Chela"

Recurring 
 Enoc Leaño as Baldomero
 Wendy Braga as Brenda
 Sahit Sosa as Abel
 Isela Vega as Eduarda
 Rodrigo Murray as Armando "El Güero" Gil
 Karla Cossío as Clara Mondragón
 Amairani as Maria Inés
 Pía Sanz as Rosario
 Lenny Zundel as Jacobo
 Bernie Paz as Rodolfo Reyes
 Rafael Nieves as Germán
 Carolina Sepúlveda as Marcela
 Sergio Kleiner as Íñigo
 Manoly Díaz as Fabrizio
 Adriana Nieto as Martha Reyes
 Gabriel Navarro as Javier
 Mar Contreras as Isaura
 Julieth Herrera as Idalia
 Gustavo Rincón as Mario
 Sebastián Gutiérrez as Jorge
 Gabriela Zamora as Rosa
 Olinka Velázquez as Silvia
 David Ramírez as Govinda
 Daphne Montesinos as Valeria
 Marcela Muñoz as Jackie
 Analay Rodriguez as Wanda
 Stephanie Saade as Yourlady
 Irving Peña as Miguel
 Jordi Rush as Pascual
 Andres Baida as Pepe Toledo
 Kevin Rogers as Sebastian
 Carlos Marmen as Felipe
 Reynaldo Rossano as Chuy
 Arturo García Tenorio as Fausto
 Alfonso Iturralde as Bernardo
 Rodrigo Massa as Richie Comanche
 Fiona Muñoz as Matilde
 Miranda Kay as Tamara

Production 
The first scenes were filmed in Jerusalem, Israel, in March 2018 and in April filming began in the forum 14 of Televisa San Ángel. At the end of July, the production of the first season entered its final stretch. Pedro Damián confirmed that the first season will have 97 episodes, 17 more than expected. Damián also revealed that he is already working in the second season and that in October he will travel to Japan for filming and intends to film also in Brazil. Filming of the first season ended on 9 November 2018. On 14 November 2018, the magazine People en Español, confirmed that there are no plans to continue doing more seasons due to the discrete audience data, however the musical group will continue.

Casting 
To choose the protagonists of the series, the production team traveled all over the world to perform casting, the series will feature actors from different parts of the world such as Israel, Japan, United States, Spain, Colombia and Peru.

Musical group 
A band was formed with eight of the main actors in the series. The members are Ale Müller, Anna Iriyama, Carlos Said, Macarena Garcia, Mauricio Abad, Roberta Damián, Santiago Achaga and Victor Varona. The band sings songs presented on the show. Like's debut performance was at Premios Juventud on 22 July 2018 in Miami. They performed their first single, "Este Movimiento". The official music video for "Este Movimiento" premiered on 10 July 2018 and was officially released for digital download and streaming on 20 July 2018. On 14 November 2018, it was announced that Ale Müller and Carlos Said left the band. An Extended play containing 4 songs from the series was released on 22 February 2019.

Rating

Episodes

Specials

Awards and nominations

References

External links 
 

2018 Mexican television series debuts
2019 Mexican television series endings
2018 telenovelas
Mexican telenovelas
Televisa telenovelas
Mexican LGBT-related television shows
Spanish-language telenovelas
Television shows set in Mexico City
Television shows set in Israel
Television shows set in Tokyo
2010s LGBT-related drama television series